4VSB is an abbreviation for 4-level vestigial sideband modulation, a type of radio transmission capable of transmitting two bits of information (22=4) at a time. Other faster but less rugged forms include 8VSB and 16VSB.  While 2VSB is more rugged, it is also slower.

References 

Radio modulation modes